Goettel is a surname. Notable people with the surname include:

Dwayne Goettel (1964–1995), Canadian electronic musician
Gerard Louis Goettel (1928–2011), American judge
Philip Goettel (1840–1920), American Civil War veteran

See also
Gettel
Goette